Eva Kutová (born 15 May 1935) is a Czechoslovak sprint canoeist who competed in the early 1960s. At the 1960 Summer Olympics in Rome, she finished eighth both in the K-1 500 m event and the K-2 500 m event.

References
Sports-reference.com profile

1935 births
Canoeists at the 1960 Summer Olympics
Czechoslovak female canoeists
Living people
Olympic canoeists of Czechoslovakia